Gareth Robert Davies (born 6 October 1959) is a Welsh former professional footballer.

Career
Born in Cardiff, Davies began his career with his hometown side Cardiff City in November 1982, joining from non-league side Sully. He made his debut in a 2–0 defeat against Stockport County during the 1986–87 season, but he went on to make just one more league appearance for the club before returning to non-league football.

References

1959 births
Living people
Footballers from Cardiff
Welsh footballers
Association football midfielders
Cardiff City F.C. players
English Football League players